William Foster (10 July 1890 – 17 December 1963) was an English competitive swimmer who represented Great Britain in the 1908 and 1912 Olympics.  He was freestyle swimmer who won gold and bronze medals as a member of British relay teams, and set a world record in the 4x200-metre freestyle relay.

At the 1908 Summer Olympics in London, he won the gold medal as part of the British 4×200-metre freestyle relay team and did not compete in any other competition.  In the 400-metre freestyle final he finished fourth and in the 1500-metre freestyle event he was eliminated in the semi-finals.

Four years later at the 1912 Summer Olympics in Stockholm, he won the bronze medal as part of the British 4×200-metre freestyle relay team. In the 400-metre freestyle competition as well as in the 1500-metre freestyle event he was eliminated in the semi-finals.

See also
 List of Olympic medalists in swimming (men)
 World record progression 4 × 200 metres freestyle relay

References

External links
profile

1890 births
1963 deaths
Male breaststroke swimmers
British male swimmers
Olympic swimmers of Great Britain
Swimmers at the 1908 Summer Olympics
Swimmers at the 1912 Summer Olympics
Olympic gold medallists for Great Britain
Olympic bronze medallists for Great Britain
World record setters in swimming
Olympic bronze medalists in swimming
British male freestyle swimmers
Medalists at the 1912 Summer Olympics
Medalists at the 1908 Summer Olympics
Olympic gold medalists in swimming